An Min(born April 1945) is a Chinese politician, former Vice Minister of Ministry of Foreign Trade and Ministry of Commerce in China.

Biography
An Min was born in April 1945 in Shaanxi, the first son of An Ziwen. He graduated from the University of International Relations with a bachelor's degree in English in 1970.

He worked for the China's Ministry of Foreign Trade from 1979 to 2003 and became the Vice Minister of Foreign Trade in 2001. When the "Ministry of Foreign Trade" reorganized and changed its name to "Ministry of Commerce" in 2003, he was appointed Vice Minister of Ministry of Commerce in China.

References

People's Republic of China politicians from Shaanxi
Chinese Communist Party politicians from Shaanxi
Politicians from Shaanxi
1945 births
20th-century Chinese economists
21st-century Chinese economists
21st-century Chinese politicians
University of International Relations alumni
Living people